Przysłup, Lesser Poland Voivodeship
 Przysłup, Subcarpathian Voivodeship